Trevor Robert Seaward Allan, LLD  (born 9 May 1955) is Professor of Jurisprudence and Public Law at the University of Cambridge and a Fellow of Pembroke College. He is known for challenging constitutional orthodoxy in the United Kingdom, particularly in his redefinition of the scope of parliamentary sovereignty.

Education and career 

Allan was educated at St Albans School and Worcester College, Oxford, where he received a MA in Jurisprudence and a BCL. He also holds a LLD from Cambridge University. He was called to the London Bar at Middle Temple.

He was a lecturer in law at the University of Nottingham between 1980 and 1985, and joined the University of Cambridge in 1989. He was elected a Fellow of the British Academy in 2016.

His books include Constitutional Justice: A Liberal Theory of the Rule of Law (OUP), Law, Liberty, and Justice: The Legal Foundations of British Constitutionalism (Clarendon Paperback), and the Sovereignty of Law: Freedom, Constitution, and Common Law (OUP).

Constitutional theory 

Allan's view is that the rule of law occupies a superior position to parliamentary sovereignty in the constitutional hierarchy. He develops this view in The Sovereignty of Law: Freedom, Constitution and Common Law.

References

British legal scholars
Living people
British philosophers
Philosophers of law
Fellows of Pembroke College, Cambridge
Fellows of the British Academy
Alumni of Worcester College, Oxford
Members of the Middle Temple
1955 births